Claudemir Ferreira da Silva (born 17 August 1984) is a Brazilian footballer.

Claudemir started his career at Vasco da Gama and played at Campeonato Brasileiro.

External links

Claudemir Ferreira Da Silva was attacked by Israeli Police on Sunday, 20 September 2015 in Jerusalem (Hebrew)

1984 births
Living people
Brazilian expatriate footballers
CR Vasco da Gama players
Marília Atlético Clube players
Itumbiara Esporte Clube players
Paraná Clube players
Madureira Esporte Clube players
C.D. Nacional players
Beitar Jerusalem F.C. players
Bnei Sakhnin F.C. players
Hapoel Tel Aviv F.C. players
Hapoel Rishon LeZion F.C. players
Primeira Liga players
Israeli Premier League players
Liga Leumit players
Expatriate footballers in Portugal
Expatriate footballers in Israel
Brazilian expatriate sportspeople in Portugal
Brazilian expatriate sportspeople in Israel
Footballers from Rio de Janeiro (city)
Brazilian footballers
Association football defenders